Joxe Pernando Barrena Arza (born 1 November 1965) is a Basque politician, former member of the Parliament of Navarre and former member of the European Parliament for Spain.

Early life
Barrena was born on 1 November 1965 in Pamplona, Navarre. His father José María Barrena Inza was a socialist mayor of Berriozar. He has Técnico Superior qualification in international trade and a degree in international relations from UOC.

Career
Barrena is a translator by profession and worked at the Txalaparta publishing house in Tafalla translating Basque and English.

Barrena joined Abertzale left (Ezker abertzalea) as a youth. He was a municipal councillor in Berriozar from 1984 to 1999.

Barrena was first arrested in 1985 for links to the separatist Euskadi Ta Askatasuna (ETA). In 1998, he along with Arnaldo Otegi and Joseba Permach, came to public prominence after the previous leadership of Herri Batasuna (HB) were jailed for links to ETA. Barrena's language skills resulted in him representing HB on an international level. He became a member of HB's national executive in 1998 and was the party's spokesperson from 2001 to 2008. He contested the 1999 regional election in Navarre as an Euskal Herritarrok electoral alliance candidate and was elected to the Parliament of Navarre.

In 2001 Barrena became a member of the national executive of the newly formed Batasuna, the successor to HB which had been dissolved. 
He was the lead candidate at the 2003 regional election in Navarre for the Autodeterminaziorako Bilgunea (AuB) electoral alliance but the Supreme Court annulled the list as it considered AuB to be a successor to Batasuna which had been banned in March 2003.

Following the death of two ETA prisoners, Igor Angulo Iturrate and Roberto Sainz del Olmo, Basque nationalists organised a strike in March 2006 which resulted in violence across Navarre and the Basque Country. Barrena and other leaders of Batasuna were arrested ion the orders of judge Fernando Grande-Marlaska who held them responsible for attacks by the strikers. Barrena was released after paying a bail of €200,000.

Barrena was a candidate at the 2007 regional election in Navarre for the Nafarroako Abertzale Sozialistak electoral alliance which was also annulled by the Supreme Court. On 4 February 2008 a conference was held at the Hotel Tres Reyes, Pamplona involving Batasuna, Basque Nationalist Party and Socialist Party of the Basque Country–Basque Country Left which was attended by Batasuna leaders Barrena, Patxi Urrutia and Unai Fanorekin. Barrena and Urrutia were arrested on 4 February 2008 on the orders of judge Baltasar Garzón for "supporting the activity of an illegal political party". Barrena was released on 3 February 2010 after paying a bail of €50,000.

Barrena was co-spokesperson for Sortu from 2012 to 2016. In April 2019 he was chosen by EH Bildu to be its leading candidate at the 2019 European Parliament election in Spain following the resignation of Josu Juaristi. He contested the election as an Ahora Repúblicas electoral alliance candidate in Spain and was elected to the European Parliament.

He left the European Parliament in September 2022.

Electoral history

References

External links

 

1965 births
Ahora Repúblicas MEPs
Basque prisoners and detainees
Basque translators
Batasuna politicians
EH Bildu MEPs
Euskal Herritarrok politicians
Herri Batasuna politicians
Living people
Members of the 5th Parliament of Navarre
MEPs for Spain 2019–2024
Municipal councillors in Navarre
Politicians from Navarre
People from Pamplona
Prisoners and detainees of Spain
Sortu MEPs